Eliza Rycembel (born 1992 in Warsaw) is a Polish actress.

She was winner of the best supporting actor award at the 44th Polish Feature Film Festival in Gdynia for the film Corpus Christi.

Biography 
From the age of six, Eliza Rycembel studied ballet at the Hanna Kamińska Dance and Acting Studio at the General Ballet School.

Filmography 

 Obietnica (2014) as Lila Śliwińska
 Carte Blanche (2015) as Klara
 Wszystko gra (2016) as Zosia/great-grandmother (dual role)
 Nina (2018) as Magda
 Piłsudski (2019) as Wanda Juszczekiczówna, daughter of Maria Piłsudska
 Ciemno, prawie noc (2019) as Ewa at age 17
 Corpus Christi (2019) as Marta

Awards 

2014: award for the best actress at the International Film Festival for Children and Youth in Vienna for her role in the film "Obietnica"
2019: distinction at the Tarnów Film Award for her role in the film  Nina

References

External links 

 
 Biography – cineuropa
 biography – filmweb.pl
 Songs 
 Eliza Rycembel Instagram site
 "Review: ‘Corpus Christi’ is an Oscar-nominated knockout" by Kenneth Turan,  Los Angeles Times, February 27, 2020
 "Oscary 2020. Eliza Rycembel założyła zjawiskową suknię od Gosi Baczynskiej" "Oscars 2020. Eliza Rycembel wearing a gorgeous dress by Gosia Baczynska" 

Living people
1992 births
Actresses from Warsaw
Polish film actresses